In basketball and other such timed sports, a buzzer beater is a shot that is taken before the game clock of a quarter, a half (if the half is the second one, then, a game), or an overtime period expires but does not go in the basket until after the clock expires and the buzzer sounds hence the name "buzzer beater". The concept normally applies to baskets that beat an end-of-quarter/2nd-half/overtime buzzer but is sometimes applied to shots that beat the shot clock buzzer.

Officials in the National Collegiate Athletic Association, National Basketball Association, Women's National Basketball Association, Serie A (Italy), and the Euroleague (Final Four series only, effective 2006) are required to use instant replay to assess whether a shot made at the end of a period was in fact released before the game clock expired. Since 2002, the NBA also has mandated LED light strips along the edges of the backboard and the edge of the scorer's table for the purposes of identifying the end of a period.

Notable buzzer beaters
Although buzzer beaters are fairly common, several instances have been recognized as special occasions:

NCAA
Dubbed "The Dunk", in the 1983 NCAA Championship Finals, NC State forward Lorenzo Charles caught Derek Whittenburg's airball and dunked it as time expired to defeat Houston 54–52. In the most improbable match-ups, NC State won its last 10 games of the season, including ACC Tournament Championship to become eligible for the NCAA Tournament. NC State also had the most regular season losses (10) of any previous NCAA Champion.
In the 1992 East Regional Finals, with 2.1 seconds left and down 103–102 in overtime, Duke forward Christian Laettner caught a full court inbounds pass from Grant Hill, turned and hit a 17-footer (5 m) at the buzzer to give the Duke Blue Devils a 104–103 victory over the Kentucky Wildcats. The lead changed hands five times in the last 31.5 seconds of overtime.
In the 1992 NCAA Tournament, the Georgia Tech Yellow Jackets' legendary coach Bobby Cremins led an inexperienced Tech team to the Sweet 16, thanks in no small part to James Forrest's buzzer-beating game-winning 3-pointer in the second round against USC (to which CBS commentator Al McGuire famously shouted, "Holy mackerel! Holy mackerel! Holy mackerel!"). With eight tenths of a second left, Forrest received a half-court inbounds pass, rotated 180 degrees and hit a three-pointer at the buzzer for the win.
On January 5, 2004, the Texas Longhorns' forward P. J. Tucker hit a buzzer beater in a game against Providence College to win 79–77 in OT. After extensive looks at instant replay, it was clear that the ball was in his hand when the game clock hit 00.0, but out before the red backboard light came on; by rule, the game ends when the backboard lights up, so the basket counted and Texas won the game.
On January 31, 2005, Guilford College was tied at 88 with Randolph-Macon College. Randolph-Macon was shooting 2 free throws with 6 tenths of a second left. After making the first to take an 89–88 lead, the second shot missed. Guilford player Jordan Snipes grabbed the rebound under the basket and threw the ball towards the other goal. The shot went in, giving Guilford a 91–89 victory. Snipes duplicated the feat several days later on air with the local news network WFMY-TV in Greensboro, North Carolina.
In the 2006 NCAA Tournament First Round, #14 seed Northwestern State (LA) stunned the #3 seed Iowa Hawkeyes 64–63 with a last-second three-pointer "off the heels" in the far corner by Jermaine Wallace. Northwestern State had come back from 17 points down with 8 minutes to play.
In a 2010 NCAA regular season game against Georgia Tech, the Maryland Terrapins, in essence, made two buzzer beaters (with only the second one counting). First, with 3 seconds on the clock, Greivis Vasquez made a half-court shot on the run to beat what would have been the buzzer. However, Maryland coach Keith Booth had called timeout with 1.5 seconds left, before Vasquez had released the ball. Following the timeout on the ensuing inbounds pass, the Terps got the ball to Cliff Tucker, who made a three-pointer at the buzzer to win the game 76–74.
On February 7, 2013, in an NCAA regular season game, Tyler Griffey made an uncontested buzzer-beating layup off an inbounds pass with 9 tenths of a second left to lead the Illinois Fighting Illini to a 74–72 upset home win over #1 ranked Indiana Hoosiers.
On March 18, 2016, during the first round of the 2016 NCAA tournament, Paul Jesperson of Northern Iowa made a buzzer beater from half court to win the game for the 11th seeded Panthers 75–72, and upset the 6th seeded Texas Longhorns.
On March 20, 2016, during the second round of the 2016 NCAA tournament, with 2.6 seconds left and the game tied at 63, Wisconsin's Bronson Koenig made a 3-point buzzer beater after receiving an inbound pass from Ethan Happ. This resulted in the 7th seeded Wisconsin upsetting the 2nd seeded Xavier.
On April 4, 2016, Villanova's Kris Jenkins hit a three-pointer at the buzzer to defeat North Carolina to win the 2016 NCAA tournament, 77–74.
On April 3, 2021, Gonzaga's Jalen Suggs hit a three-pointer at the buzzer to defeat UCLA to win the NCAA Tournament Final Four, 93–90. Gonzaga would go on to the championship, but lost to Baylor 86–70.

NBA

 :
 On March 15, 1998, Voshon Lenard hit a buzzer beater to give his Miami Heat a 79–76 victory over the Orlando Magic. The goal was initially disallowed, but following video review, it was allowed after it was determined that the ball was out of Lenard's hands before the Orlando Arena game clock struck 00:0.
 :
 On January 3, 2007, Gilbert Arenas scored a 32-foot buzzer-beater to lead the Washington Wizards to win the game against the Milwaukee Bucks 108–105.
 On January 15, 2007, Gilbert Arenas' game-winning 3-point shot led the Washington Wizards to a 114–111 victory against the Utah Jazz.
 
 On December 2, 2008, Troy Murphy tipped in a buzzer-beating shot to lift the Indiana Pacers over the Los Angeles Lakers 118–117.
 On January 23, 2009, LeBron James scored a buzzer beater to lead the Cleveland Cavaliers to a 106–105 victory against the Golden State Warriors.
 :
 On December 4, 2009, Kobe Bryant's game-winning three-pointer over Dwyane Wade gave the Los Angeles Lakers a 108–107 victory against the Miami Heat.
 On January 14, 2010, rookie Sundiata Gaines hit a 3-pointer at the buzzer to end a frenzied series of comebacks and give the Utah Jazz a 97-96 victory over the Cleveland Cavaliers on Thursday night.
 On March 25, 2010, Josh Smith swooped in to slam through Joe Johnson's missed shot just ahead of the buzzer and the Atlanta Hawks finally beat the Orlando Magic, clinching a third straight trip to the playoffs with an 86-84 victory.
 :
 On December 21, 2010, Mike Dunleavy's tip-in at the buzzer gave the Indiana Pacers a 94-93 victory over the New Orleans Hornets.
 On December 29, 2010, Tyreke Evans made a 3-pointer from midcourt as time expired, lifting the Sacramento Kings to a 100-98 win over the Memphis Grizzlies on Wednesday night.
  – On December 29, 2011, Kevin Durant of the Oklahoma City Thunder led the team to a 104–102 win over the Dallas Mavericks, thanks to his game-winning dagger three-pointer.
 :
 On November 9, 2013, Jeff Green hit a 3-pointer at the buzzer to lift the Boston Celtics to a 111-110 victory over the Miami Heat.
 On November 15, 2013, Joe Johnson stole a pass and dropped in a short jumper as time expired in overtime, giving the Brooklyn Nets a 100-98 win over the Phoenix Suns on Friday night.
 On February 7, 2014, Tobias Harris scored a game-winning dunk as the buzzer sounded as Orlando Magic won 104–103 against the Oklahoma City Thunder.
 On February 24, 2014, Dirk Nowitzki's 19-foot jumper bounced up and then fell in as time expired, giving the Dallas Mavericks a 110-108 victory over the New York Knicks.
 :
 On November 14, 2014, Courtney Lee scored on a lob pass as time expired to cap a furious fourth-quarter rally, and the Memphis Grizzlies came from 26 points down to beat the Sacramento Kings 111-110 on Thursday night.
 On January 23, 2015, James Harden creates space and knocks down the game winning jumper as time expires to lead the Houston Rockets to a 113-111 victory over the Phoenix Suns.
 On February 6, 2015, Anthony Davis led the New Orleans Pelicans to a 116–113 win vs. the Oklahoma City Thunder.
  – On March 23, 2016, Emmanuel Mudiay made a 35-footer at the buzzer to finish with 27 points and give the Denver Nuggets a 104-103 victory over the Philadelphia 76ers.
 :
 On January 4, 2017, Giannis Antetokounmpo made a turnaround jumper at the buzzer to give the Milwaukee Bucks a 105-104 victory over the New York Knicks.
 On March 5, 2017, then-Phoenix Suns rookie Tyler Ulis made the 3-point shot at the buzzer to upset the Boston Celtics and win the game for the Suns 109–106.
 On April 9, 2017, Russell Westbrook led the Oklahoma City Thunder to a 106–105 win against the Denver Nuggets with his 42nd career triple-double and a buzzer beater.
 :
 On October 23, 2017, Andrew Wiggins made a 3-point shot as the buzzer sounded to lead the Minnesota Timberwolves to a 115–113 victory against the Oklahoma City Thunder.
 On December 26, 2017, Tyson Chandler dunked Dragan Bender's inbounds pass from the opposite sideline with 0.4 seconds remaining to give the Phoenix Suns a 99-97 victory over the Memphis Grizzlies.
 On February 7, 2018, LeBron James scored another game winner at the buzzer in overtime to lead the Cleveland Cavaliers 140–138 against the Minnesota Timberwolves.
 :
 On December 23, 2018, Luka Dončić of the Dallas Mavericks scored a game-tying buzzer beater to tie the Portland Trail Blazers 107–all and force an overtime.
 On February 7, 2019, Rajon Rondo's game winning shot stuns his former team, the Boston Celtics, and wins it for the Los Angeles Lakers to win the game 129–128.
 On February 27, 2019, Dwyane Wade of the Miami Heat scored a three-point shot with no time left to defeat the Golden State Warriors 126–125.
 On March 24, 2019, Jeremy Lamb hit the half-court shot to stun the Kawhi Leonard-led Toronto Raptors and win the game for the Charlotte Hornets 115–114.
 :
 On December 23, 2020, Buddy Hield pushed the ball to lead the Sacramento Kings to a 124–122 win against the Denver Nuggets.
 On March 27, 2021, Harrison Barnes of the Sacramento Kings scored a 3-pointer as the time expired to win the game 100–97 against the Cleveland Cavaliers.
 On April 14, 2021, Luka Dončić scored another regular season buzzer-beater to lead the Dallas Mavericks to a 114–113 victory against the Memphis Grizzlies.
 On May 3, 2021, Ben Simmons saved Joel Embiid's attempt at a 3-point shot to lift the Philadelphia 76ers to a 113–111 victory against the San Antonio Spurs in overtime.
 :
 On October 27, 2021, Harrison Barnes of the Sacramento Kings scores the 3-pointer to 110-107 comeback victory against Phoenix Suns.
 On November 6, 2021,  Luka Dončić scored a 3-point buzzer-beater to lead the Dallas Mavericks to a 107-104 victory against the Boston Celtics, making him to beat the buzzers twice in six months and two regular seasons.
 On December 15, 2021, Devonte' Graham scored the improbable 61–foot buzzer-beater right after Shai Gilgeous-Alexander's 30-footer with 1.4 seconds remaining, lifting New Orleans Pelicans to a 113-110 victory over the Oklahoma City Thunder.
 On December 31, 2021, DeMar DeRozan of the Chicago Bulls scores the one-legged buzzer beater to lead the Chicago Bulls to a 108-106 victory over Indiana Pacers. The following night, he scored another buzzer-beater to beat the Washington Wizards 120-119, making him the first man to beat the buzzers twice in two days.
 On January 21, 2022, Stephen Curry of the Golden State Warriors scored a buzzer beater against the Houston Rockets guard Kevin Porter Jr. to allow the Warriors to win 105-103. It was Curry's first career game-winning buzzer beater. 
 On February 16, 2022, Stephen Curry's clutch shot gave the Golden State Warriors a 115–114 against the Denver Nuggets. A free throw from the Warriors followed and then Monte Morris scored a game-winning 3-pointer, and the Nuggets won 117–116.
 :
 On November 5, 2022, De'Aaron Fox of Sacramento Kings scored the insane 31-foot buzzer beater from the logo by beating the Orlando Magic 126–123, in overtime.
 On March 17, 2023, Maxi Kleber of the Dallas Mavericks made a buzzer-beating, game-winning three-pointer in a 111–110 win over the Los Angeles Lakers.

Playoffs

 In Game 1 of the 1950 NBA Finals, Bob Harrison hit a 40-foot (12 m) buzzer-beater to win the game for the Lakers, 68–66.
 In Game 3 of the 1962 NBA Finals, Jerry West steals the ball and makes a layup as the time expired to give the lakers a 2-1 lead over the Celtics.
 In Game 4 of the 1969 NBA Finals, Sam Jones hit an off-balance 18-footer (5.5 m) as time expired to lift the Celtics to a series-tying 89–88 win over the Lakers.
 In Game 3 of the 1970 NBA Finals, with the Lakers trailing the Knicks 102–100. Jerry West sank a desperation buzzer-beating 60-foot (18 m) shot to tie the game. Since the three-point field goal was not adopted until the 1979–80 NBA season, it only tied the game. The Lakers lost 111–108 in OT.
 In Game 5 of the 1976 NBA Finals, Gar Heard hit a buzzer beater against the Boston Celtics to tie the game at 112 and force a third overtime. This was one of the many high points of the game, which the Celtics won, 128–126. Heard's shot is one of the many reasons the NBA refers to Game 5 as "The Greatest Game Ever Played".
 In Game 1 of the 1986 Eastern Conference First Round, Dudley Bradley banked in a 3-pointer at the buzzer to win the game 95–94 for the Bullets after the 76ers led 94–77 with 3 minutes left.
 In Game 3 of the 1986 Western Conference Semifinals, Derek Harper hit a long 3 with 3 seconds left to beat the Lakers, 110–108.
 In Game 5 of the 1986 Western Conference Finals, the Rockets and Lakers were tied at 112 with 1 second left and the ball at half-court. Ralph Sampson hit a turn-around shot at the buzzer to win the series for Houston.
 In Game 5 of the 1989 Eastern Conference First Round, Michael Jordan took the inbounds pass with 3 seconds left, sprinted to the free throw line and hit The Shot over Craig Ehlo at the buzzer to beat the Cleveland Cavaliers 101–100.
 In Game 4 of the 1993 Eastern Conference First Round, with Charlotte down 103–102 with 3.3 seconds left, Alonzo Mourning took the inbounds pass and hit a 20-footer (6 m) with 4 tenths left.
 In Game 4 of the 1993 Eastern Conference Semifinals, "The Shot II". With the score tied at 101, Michael Jordan made an 18-foot fade-away over Gerald Wilkins at the buzzer to give the Bulls a 103–101 victory and sweep Cleveland.
 In Game 3 of the 1994 Eastern Conference Semifinals with 1.8 seconds left and the Bulls down 2–0 in the series, Toni Kukoč sank a 23-ft (7 m) fadeaway at the buzzer to give Chicago a 104–102 victory over New York.
 In Game 5 of the 1995 Western Conference Semifinals, Nick Van Exel hit a 3 with 5 tenths of a second left in OT to give the Lakers a 98–96 win over the Spurs. He had also hit a 3 with 10.2 seconds left in regulation to tie it at 88 and force overtime.
 In Game 1 of the 1995 Eastern Conference Semifinals, Reggie Miller scored 8 points in 8.9 seconds to erase a 6-point deficit and beat New York, 107–105.
 In Game 4 of the 1995 Eastern Conference Finals, Indiana's Rik Smits faked a shot over Tree Rollins, then hit a 10-footer (3 m) at the buzzer to beat Orlando 94–93. The lead changed hands four times in the last 13.3 seconds.
 In Game 1 of the 1995 NBA Finals, Houston's Hakeem Olajuwon tipped in a missed layup by Clyde Drexler with 3 tenths of a second left in OT to beat the Magic 120–118.
 In Game 4 of the 1997 Western Conference First Round, the Suns' Rex Chapman caught an overthrown Jason Kidd pass and made a falling-out-of-bounds 3 with 1.9 seconds left to tie it at 107. The Suns still lost 122–115 in OT.
 In Game 4 of the 1997 Western Conference Finals, Houston's Eddie Johnson hit a buzzer-beating 3 to beat Utah 95–92.
 In Game 6 of the 1997 Western Conference Finals, John Stockton hit a 3 at the buzzer, lifting Utah over Houston 103–100 to win the series 4–2.
 In Game 1 of the 1997 NBA Finals, Michael Jordan hit a jumper over Bryon Russell at the buzzer to give Chicago an 84–82 victory.
 In Game 4 of the 1998 Eastern Conference Finals, Indiana was trailing Chicago 94–93 with 2.9 seconds left. Derrick McKey inbounded to Reggie Miller, who hit the game-winning 3 with 7 tenths left. They still lost the Series. The Bulls went on to win the NBA Championship against the Utah Jazz.
 In Game 4 of the 2002 NBA Western Conference Finals, the Lakers were trailing the Kings 99–97 with 11.8 seconds left. The Lakers were trailing 2–1 in the series and faced Game 5 in Sacramento. After Kobe Bryant and Shaquille O'Neal missed consecutive layups, Vlade Divac swatted the ball away in a vain attempt to run out the clock. However, it went right to Robert Horry, who caught the ball and hit a three-pointer at the buzzer to give the Lakers a 100–99 victory.
 In Game 1 of the 2003 Western Conference First Round, Stephon Marbury of the Phoenix Suns scored a buzzer beater and had a 96-95 victory against the San Antonio Spurs.
 In Game 5 of the 2004 Western Conference Semifinals, Tim Duncan made a fade-away 18-footer (5.5 m) over Shaquille O'Neal to give the Spurs a 73–72 lead with 4 tenths of a second left, but Derek Fisher hit a 20-footer (6 m) at the buzzer to win the game for the Lakers 74–73.
 In Game 5 of the 2004 Eastern Conference Semifinals, with the series tied at 2, the Detroit Pistons were down 88–85 to the Nets with no timeouts. Chauncey Billups banked in a 3 from half-court at the buzzer to tie the game at 88. Detroit lost in 3OT, but won the series in 7 and proceeded to defeat the Lakers 4–1 in the NBA Finals.
 In Game 4 of the 2006 Western Conference First Round, Kobe Bryant made a buzzer beater to defeat Phoenix 99–98 and give the Lakers a 3–1 series lead. The Phoenix Suns, however, won the series in seven games and are the 8th team to overcome a 3–1 series deficit.
 In Game 2 of the 2009 Eastern Conference Finals, LeBron James took the inbounds pass and hit a 3 at the buzzer to give the Cavaliers a 96–95 victory over the Orlando Magic. This buzzer beater caused the Cavs to tie the series against the Orlando Magic.
 In Game 5 of the 2010 Western Conference Finals, after Kobe Bryant air-balled a 3, Ron Artest hit the put-back at the buzzer to give the Los Angeles Lakers a 103–101 win over the Phoenix Suns to give the Lakers a 3–2 series lead. The Lakers won the series 4–2 and went on to win their 2nd straight title.
 In Game 1 of the 2013 Eastern Conference Finals, with the Heat down 102–101 in overtime against the Indiana Pacers, LeBron James made a driving lay-up as time expired in OT to give the Heat a 103–102 win over the Pacers.
 In Game 3 of the 2014 Western Conference First Round, Vince Carter hit a 3 from the left corner at the buzzer, giving the Mavericks a 109–108 victory and a 2–1 series lead over the San Antonio Spurs. However, Dallas would lose in 7 games to the eventual NBA champion Spurs.
 In Game 6 of the 2014 Western Conference First Round, with the Portland Trail Blazers down 98–96 with 9 tenths left, Damian Lillard hit a buzzer beating 3 off the inbounds pass to beat the Houston Rockets 99–98 and win the series 4–2.
 In Game 3 of the 2015 Eastern Conference Semifinals, Derrick Rose banked in a 3 at the buzzer to give the Chicago Bulls a 99–96 win against the Cavaliers and take a 2–1 series lead.
 In Game 4 of the 2015 Eastern Conference Semifinals, LeBron James hit a corner 2 at the buzzer to give the Cavaliers an 86–84 win against the Bulls and tie the series at two, while Cavaliers coach David Blatt was being held back from trying to call a timeout. Cleveland had none at the time, and the technical foul would have given Chicago a free throw and possession.
 In Game 3 of the 2015 Eastern Conference Semifinals, Paul Pierce banked in a step-back 21-footer (6.5 m) at the buzzer to give the Washington Wizards a 103–101 win against the Atlanta Hawks and take a 2–1 series lead.
 In Game 1 of the 2016 Eastern Conference Semifinals, Kyle Lowry of the Toronto Raptors hit a half-court shot at the buzzer to tie it at 90. Toronto eventually lost to the Heat 102–96 in OT.
 In Game 5 of the 2018 Eastern Conference First Round, LeBron James hit a game winner at the buzzer to give the Cavaliers a 98–95 win against the Pacers and take a 3–2 series lead.
 In Game 3 of the 2018 Eastern Conference Semifinals, LeBron James hit a floater at the buzzer to defeat the Raptors 105–103 and take a 3–0 series lead.
 In Game 5 of the 2019 Western Conference First Round, Damian Lillard hit a game-winning 3-pointer at the buzzer from 36 feet and Paul George's outstretched arm to beat the Thunder 118–115 and win the series 4–1.
 In Game 7 of the 2019 Eastern Conference Semifinals, Kawhi Leonard's last-second shot bounced off the rim four times before falling to give the Raptors a 92–90 victory over the 76ers to advance to the Eastern Conference Finals.
 In Game 4 of the 2020 Western Conference First Round, Luka Doncic hit a 28-foot 3-pointer at the buzzer to win the game for the Mavericks, 135–133.
 In Game 3 of the 2020 Eastern Conference Semifinals, OG Anunoby hit a corner 3-pointer with 5 tenths of a second to give the Raptors the win over the Celtics, 104–103.
 In Game 2 of the 2020 Western Conference Finals, with the Lakers trailing 103–102, Anthony Davis hit a 3-pointer with 2.1 seconds to win the game, 105–103, and give the Lakers a 2–0 series lead.
 In Game 2 of the 2021 Western Conference Finals, with the Suns trailing 103–102, Deandre Ayton puts up 24 points, alongside a buzzer-beating, game-winning alley-oop dunk, and 14 rebounds, to beat the Los Angeles Clippers.
 In Game 1 of the 2022 Eastern Conference First Round, the Boston Celtics defeated the Brooklyn Nets 115–114 with Jayson Tatum's buzzer-beating layup.

WNBA
On September 4, 1999, during Game 2 of the 1999 WNBA Finals, Teresa Weatherspoon of the New York Liberty made a buzzer beater from just beyond the half-court line to beat the Houston Comets 68–67, and tie the series at one game apiece. The Comets eventually won the series, two games to one.

Olympics and Europe
In the 1972 Olympic Finals, Alexander Belov of the Soviet Union scored a last-second basket after catching a full-court desperation launch by a teammate. As time expired, Belov hit a layup that won the game 51–50 against the U.S. team.
In the second round of the 1997 Eurobasket, in a high-strung game between FR Yugoslavia and Croatia (the first one after the breakup of SFR Yugoslavia and the ensuing Yugoslav wars), Aleksandar Đorđević won the game for Yugoslavia 64–62 with a coast-to-coast three-pointer. The same player won the 1992 Euroleague title for Partizan Belgrade in strikingly similar fashion (albeit with 2 seconds left on the clock).
(Euroleague) On April 7, 2004, Maccabi Tel Aviv was trailing Žalgiris at home, on the decisive round-robin match to determine which team advances to the Final Four tournament, held later that month on Maccabi's home court in Tel Aviv. Maccabi's failure to advance would mean utter disaster, as team officials battled all season long against Euroleague attempts to relocate the tournament due to ensuing Al-Aqsa Intifada and similar UEFA ban on football (soccer) matches hosted in Israel. With 2 seconds remaining and Maccabi trailing by 3, Derrick Sharp caught a long pass from Gur Shelef, turned to the basket and fired a game-tying fade-away three-pointer, forcing overtime. Maccabi won that game, advanced to the Final Four and became Euroleague Champion, winning the final game against Skipper Bologna by the all-time record score of 118–74.
 On August 15, 2004, in the first game of the Olympic Games, after a run of Alejandro Montecchia, Manu Ginóbili received the ball trailing 82–81 against Serbia and Montenegro with 7 tenths of a second left. He made the shot while falling sideways after it hit the board. Argentina then would win the gold medal. 
 In an exhibition match between the US and Germany during the run-up to the 2004 Olympics, a less than stellar Team USA was saved by Allen Iverson (then of the Philadelphia 76ers), who hit a half-court shot to keep the game from going into overtime.
 On April 25, 2010, in the title game of the 2009–10 ABA League, Partizan Belgrade topped Cibona Zagreb in overtime in Arena Zagreb, thanks to an off-the-glass three-pointer by Dušan Kecman from half-court at the buzzer, bringing the celebration of Cibona players and staff (who already invaded the floor as Bojan Bogdanović hit a corner three-pointer for Cibona with just 6 tenths left on the clock) to an abrupt end. Partizan thus won its fourth consecutive Adriatic League title. The final score was 75–74.
 On January 24, 2014, in a Top 16 Euroleague game between Anadolu Efes and EA7 Emporio Armani Milan, Efes was trailing by two points when Keith Langford from Milan had another free throw attempt (after hitting the first one) with three seconds left on the game clock. He then probably missed the second free throw on purpose so that Anadolu Efes cannot take another timeout. Zoran Planinić from Anadolu Efes then grabbed the rebound, took one dribble and threw the ball from within their own three point line to the basket of Milan. He made it and no time remained on the game clock; the final score was 61–60.
 On April 25, 2014, in the semifinal game of the 2013–14 ABA League Final Four, between Partizan Belgrade and Cedevita Zagreb, Cedevita was trailing with 1 point and possession less. Milenko Tepić of Partizan missed the three-point shot with 6 seconds left, Nolan Smith of Cedevita grabbed the ball, ran to the other side of the court with his defenders not guarding him, and hit a running three-point buzzer beater from 30 feet (9 m). The final score was 81–79. The significance of that shot is even more than just a victory, if it is known that it secured a direct spot in the 2014–15 Euroleague season for Cedevita, while leaving Partizan out of the Euroleague for the first time after 14 years, and the first time since ULEB takeover of the competition in 2000.
 On September 16, 2018, Greece national basketball team qualified to the 2019 FIBA Basketball World Cup after a thrilling win with a buzzer beater made by Kostas Papanikolaou after a Nick Calathes assist in Tbilisi over Georgia 86–85.

Asia

PBA
 In Game 6 of the 2016 PBA Governors' Cup Finals, Justin Brownlee hits the championship-winning 3-point shot at the buzzer against the Meralco Bolts to end the 8-year championship drought of Barangay Ginebra San Miguel, with the score of 91–88 at the end. This is the first-ever championship-winning buzzer beater in professional basketball.
 In Game 5 of the 2019 PBA Philippine Cup Finals, Mark Barroca gave the Magnolia Hotshots a 3–2 Finals lead against the eventual champions San Miguel Beermen, the final score is 88–86.

MPBL
 In the winner-take-all championship game of the 2021 MPBL Invitational, Philip Manalang of the Basilan Jumbo Plastic, hits the championship-winning 3-point shot at the buzzer against the Nueva Ecija Rice Vanguards to win the 2 million peso prize with the score of 83–80 in overtime.

In other sports
The term is sometimes applied to analogous achievements in other sports.

Ice hockey
In ice hockey, a buzzer beater is a goal that is scored just before the clock expires in a period. Unlike in basketball, the puck must completely cross the goal line with 0.1 seconds or more remaining on the clock in order for the goal to count; if the period expires (the exact moment when the green goal light comes on at 0.0 seconds) before the puck completely crosses the goal line, the goal is disallowed.

Football

In Australian rules football there are kicks after the siren, where a mark or free kick awarded just before the end of a quarter may be kicked as the final action of that period. In Gaelic football play is extended to allow for the kick of a free kick or puck awarded prior to the end of a half.

In gridiron football, a touchdown after time expires or a field goal (or, much more rarely, a successful fair catch kick in American football or an open-field single point in Canadian) kicked as time expires can be described as a "buzzer beater," though no actual buzzers are used in that sport. More generally, in all codes, if a play (whether or not involving a kick) is in progress at the time the clock expires, play continues until the ball is dead. (In American football, the snap on the buzzer-beating play must take place before the clock expired, except if the defense commits a foul on the last play, in which case an untimed down is added. In Canadian football, a play can and must be executed even if the clock expires after the previous play but before the snap.) Several important games have been decided on the outcome of buzzer beaters, such as Super Bowl XXXVI and Super Bowl XXXVIII, both of which were decided on successful kicks by Adam Vinatieri; in contrast, Scott Norwood's infamous missed kick in Super Bowl XXV decided that game in favor of the opposing New York Giants. A related concept in football is the Hail Mary pass.

In rugby union the game does not end until the ball goes dead after time has expired – therefore if a side trailing by less than one score can maintain possession and keep the ball in play they have a chance of victory. A rule change in 2017 amended the rules so that if a penalty is awarded the ball can be kicked out and a line-out taken, even if time has elapsed. The rules in rugby league also allow for play after time has elapsed; however, a tackle will also end the game, meaning that significant extensions are less likely.

Lacrosse
Starting with the 2018 season, the National Federation of State High School Associations rules for high school boys' field lacrosse in the United States allow for buzzer-beaters. A goal counts if the shot was released before the official's whistle signaling the end of play for any period of the game, even if it goes in after having previously contacted part of the goal or a defensive player (post-whistle shots that contact an offensive player in any way before entering the goal, however, do not count). The opposing team may request a stick check after buzzer-beaters, unless it comes at the end of the game and does not result in overtime, since the rules consider the game over at that point.

US Lacrosse similarly changed the youth rules the same season to allow buzzer-beaters. However, the National Collegiate Athletic Association rules for men's lacrosse still require that any shot enter the goal before the whistle to score.

See also
 Last-minute goal (soccer)
 List of Hail Mary passes in American football 
 List of longest NBA field goals
 Kicks after the siren in Australian rules football 
 Walk-off home run

References

Basketball terminology
Ice hockey terminology